Atabey is a town and district of Isparta Province in the Mediterranean region of Turkey. The mayor is Ali Bal (MHP). The population is 4,153 as of 2010.

References

External links
 District governor's official website 

Populated places in Isparta Province
Districts of Isparta Province
Atabey District
Pisidia